Pinacolada Records is an independent record label based in Christchurch, New Zealand. Run by Tim Baird, the label is notable for releasing the debut album from DFA Records artist the Shocking Pinks, as well the acclaimed debut albums by Pig Out and the Tiger Tones.

The seventh release on the label was put out late April 2008 and was the self-titled debut album from Christchurch group Tiger Tones. The label went into hiatus after this seventh release. since gaining his PhD, Baird is now a Lecturer of Marketing at Lincoln University in Christchurch, and is also one of the founding members of online Christchurch-based independent radio station 8K (located at www.8k.nz).

Discography 
Rockwood 'Chee'/'Kung Fu Philosophy' (12" vinyl,released September 2001.Cat no:PINA1201)

Rockwood - 'Trippers Guide to House'(full-length album.CD released 25 November 2002.Cat no: PINACD01)

Thisinformation feat. Mark de Clive Lowe 'Extensionz Of Da Mindz'/'Galaxy Blues'(12" vinyl, released March 2003. Cat no: PINA1202)

Headspace 'Fly Away'(instrumental mix)b/w Fanatica 'Scent Of Love'(12" vinyl, released November 2004.Cat. no: PINA1203)

Shocking Pinks - 'Dance The Dance Electric' (their debut full-length album.CD released 14 February 2004.Cat. no: Pinacolada Records PINACD02)

Pig Out - 'Club Poems'(Pinacolada Records Cat. no: PINACD03. Released 20 November 2006)

Tiger Tones - 'Tiger Tones'(Pinacolada Records Cat no: PINACD04,released 21 April 2008)

New Zealand independent record labels